Melgarejo is a 1937  Argentine film directed and written by Luis Moglia Barth. The film premiered in the US on September 19, 1937 and starred Santiago Gómez Cou and Mecha Ortiz. Editing to the film was performed by Carlos Rinaldi.

Cast

Florencio Parravicini as  Cándido Melgarejo
Mecha Ortiz as Clotilde Contreras
Santiago Gómez Cou as Ricardo
Orestes Caviglia as Carlos Bertolini
Blanca del Prado  as Julia Bertolini
Ernesto Raquén as Juancito
Rufino Córdoba as Clodomiro Barragán
Margarita Padín as Cholita
Ilde Pirovano as María Malatesta
Blanca Vidal as Remigia Contreras
Adelaida Soler as Martina
José Ruzo as Capataz
Dorita Ferreyro as Invitada 1 (as Dora Ferreiro)
Tilda Thamar as Invitada 2
Malisa Zini as Invitada 3
Herminia Velich  as Invitada 4
Delia Garcés as Invitada 5
Manuel Alcón as Liborio
Amanda Varela as Invitada 6
Juan Vítola
Emilio Velich

References

External links

1937 films
1930s Spanish-language films
Argentine black-and-white films
Films directed by Luis Moglia Barth
Argentine comedy films
1937 comedy films
1930s Argentine films